The history of sports in the United States shows that American football, baseball, softball and indoor soccer evolved out of older British (Rugby football, British baseball, rounders and association football) sports. However, volleyball, basketball, skateboarding, snowboarding and Ultimate are American inventions, some of which have become popular in other countries. American football and baseball diverged greatly from the European sports from which they arose, having evolved into distinctly American sports; baseball has achieved international popularity, particularly in East Asia and Latin America, while American football remains a niche. Lacrosse derives from Native American activities that predate Western contact.

Precolonial era
The oldest sport in America is lacrosse. The Native Americans have been playing lacrosse for several millennia. Also, in ancient Polynesia, especially in ancient Hawaii, people had been surfing since at least the 12th century.

Colonial era

In Chesapeake society (that is, colonial Virginia and Maryland), sports occupied a great deal of attention at every social level, starting at the top. In England, hunting was severely restricted to landowners. In America, game was more than plentiful. Everyone—including servants and enslaved people—could and did hunt, so there was no social distinction to be had. In 1691, Sir Francis Nicholson, the governor of Virginia, organized competitions for the “better sort of Virginians onely who are Batchelors,” and he offered prizes “to be shot for, wrastled, played at backswords, & Run for by Horse and foott.” Horse racing was the main event. The typical farmer did not own a horse in the first place, and racing was a matter for gentlemen only, but ordinary farmers were spectators and gamblers. Selected slaves often became skilled horse trainers. Horse racing was especially important for knitting the gentry together. The race was a major public event designed to demonstrate to the world the superior social status of the gentry through expensive breeding, training, boasting and gambling, and especially winning the races themselves.<ref>Struna, "The Formalizing of Sport and the Formation of an Elite pp 212-16.</ref>  Historian Timothy Breen explains that horseracing and high-stakes gambling were essential to maintaining the status of the gentry. When they publicly bet a large fraction of their wealth on their favorite horse, it told the world that competitiveness, individualism, and materialism were the core elements of gentry values.

Religion and Sport

Christianity somewhat limited early sporting events in Colonial America as a result of dissenting reformers like the Puritans who did not hold the same views as the Anglican Church. Where the Anglican Church held positive views towards sporting events, Calvinist principles shifted the positions the reforming Protestant's held on sports. This led to more restrictive approaches to sport where the only tolerated events needed to be done "for sober, practical purposes" such as military maneuvers. It took until the late nineteenth century for this "religious prohibitionism" to flip in the opposite direction. It was then that Protestants began to see sport as having more "spiritual and moral value" which was embodied through organizations such as the Young Men's Christian Association, also known as the YMCA.

Early 19th century

Slave plantations

On the large slave plantations, the popular male sports were wrestling, boxing, racing, hunting, and fishing. The most popular recreations for women were dancing and singing. David Wiggins says the masters typically tolerated the slaves' pastimes as long as they were ready to work when called upon.  The slave children improvised their games. Girls, for example, favored "ring dances," accompanied by songs and riddles.

Horse racing

Horse racing remained the leading sport in the 1780-1860 era, especially in the South. It involved owners, trainers and spectators from all social classes and both races. However, religious evangelists were troubled by the gambling dimension, and democratic elements complained that it was too aristocratic, since only the rich could own very expensive competitive horses. The Civil War devastated the wealth needed to support the sport in the South.  Thoroughbred racing revived in the North in the 1870s. Elite jockey clubs operated the most prestigious racetracks. They soon faced competition from profit-oriented proprietary racetracks especially in resort towns such as Saratoga Springs New York. Gambling was legal at the track, but an even larger amount was wagered off-track by unlicensed bookies, often backed by criminal syndicates. Moral opposition led by evangelical Protestants and social reformers led nearly all states to close their tracks by 1910.  Much of the spectator attention shifted to automobile racing, where technology was central rather than gambling. Some tracks had both automobile and horse racing. One example was the Pennsboro Speedway, which opened for horse racing in 1887, and added automobile racing in 1926. It was the original home of the Hillbilly 100 from 1967 to 1998; the track became obsolete and closed in 2002.

Horse racing made its comeback in the 1920s, as state governments legalized on-track betting which provided a welcome new flow of state revenues from a voluntary activity without imposing compulsory taxes on all citizens. By the 1950s, more people attended horse races than any other sport. Since the late 20th century, horse racing has struggled against competition from other sports and casinos.

Baseball

Baseball evolved in New York City in the early part of the 19th Century, with the first organized league, the National Association of Base Ball Players, emerging in 1857. It would eventually be the first team sport in the United States to be professionalized with the 1869 founding of the original Cincinnati Red Stockings (from whom the modern-day Cincinnati Reds took their name).

Cricket

Cricket was imported from Britain to the United States, and accounts vary as to its popularity in early America. John Thorn, official historian of the MLB, says that in the 1850s, both cricket and baseball were considered the "national pastimes". Regardless, it declined in popularity after the Civil War, with baseball replacing it as the national bat-and-ball game. This decline occurred for a number of reasons; cricket was considered too long to play, requiring a few days to play, and it was resisted on nativist grounds as being of British origin, with baseball being considered a more suitable American-origin replacement.

 20th century 
Manliness

Organized sports played a major role in defining new models of manliness by the mid-19th century. Boxing was professionalized, and emphasized the physical and confrontational aspects of masculinity. Bare-knuckle fighting without gloves represented "the manly art" in 19th century America. Historian Steven Elliott Tripp has explored the reaction of fans to Ty Cobb, the most dominant American baseball star of the early 20th century. He was “a player fans loved to hate,” so much so that he became the pioneer sports celebrity. It was the male fans who responded enthusiastically to how Cobb demonstrated in action a new level of modern masculinity. Cobb did that by his performance as a specialist in his art, a man with iron nerve, undaunted, fighting to advance his team and his career by crushing his weaker, less-masculine opponents. Cobb demonstrated raw emotion and encouraged his audience to participate in the manly struggle underway in the stadium by shouting their taunts and jeers at the opposing team.

Minorities seek a role
In the early 20th century, elite male and female athletes were being coached by men. Women coaches at the collegiate level developed an alternative to the highly competitive masculine model of sport in the 1920s. They created "play days" for women during which participation, cooperation, and social interaction were more the focus than victory and defeat. The motto was: ‘Play With Us, Not Against Us.’ This mode of sport also represented an effort by female administrators to obtain more control over women's athletic activity with a feminist perspective.

At the sixty or so historically black colleges, such as Howard University in Washington and Fisk University in Nashville, students and alumni developed a strong interest in athletics during the 1920s and 1930s. Sports were expanding rapidly at state universities, but very few black stars were recruited there.  Race newspapers hailed athletic success as a demonstration of racial progress. Black schools hired coaches, recruited and featured stellar athletes, and set up their own leagues.Patrick B. Miller and David Kenneth Wiggins, eds. Sport and the color line: Black athletes and race relations in twentieth-century America (Psychology Press, 2004).

A baseball color line existed from 1887 until Jackie Robinson broke the barrier and became the first black player in modern professional baseball in 1947; even before 1887, black baseball players in organized baseball were rare. Black players generally played in Negro league baseball, in leagues of varying stability and caliber. Black players in professional American football were somewhat more common, as the sport was predominantly white but integrated (including blacks, Hispanics, Native Americans—among them Olympic superstar Jim Thorpe and others from his alma mater Carlisle Indian School—and Asians) from its beginnings; George Preston Marshall was able to enforce a 13-year color barrier on the National Football League from 1933 to 1946 and continued to refuse to sign black players to his own team, the Washington Redskins, until 1962. NFL integration in the late 1940s came as professional football was brought to California, where college and professional teams remained fully integrated; when the NFL placed its first team (the Los Angeles Rams) in the state in 1946, it was obligated to integrate, and did so by signing college superstar Joe Aguirre, Kenny Washington and future acting star Woody Strode. 	
One of the most notable events involved the 1956 Sugar Bowl. The game was played shortly after the Rosa Parks event and much controversy preceded the game. Segregationists tried to keep Pitt fullback/linebacker Bobby Grier from playing because he was black. Georgia's governor publicly threatened the Georgia Tech's president Blake R. Van Leer to cancel the game. Ultimately, Bobby Grier played making this the first integrated Sugar Bowl and is regarded as the first integrated bowl game in the Deep South. The first Latino quarterback to win a Super Bowl, Jim Plunkett, and seven years later Doug Williams became the first black quarterback to win a Super Bowl. The first Latino coach to win a Super Bowl, Tom Flores, also did so before the first black coach, Tony Dungy, won a Super Bowl and the first Latino player in the league.

1930s
During the New Deal of 1933–39, public sports facilities were upgraded and expanded with large sums of relief money. The CWA, WPA, and CCC were large nationwide relief projects that typically favored collaboration with local government, which often provided the plans and the site, as well as the materials and the heavy equipment, while the federal government provided the labor. Building new recreational facilities in public parks fit the model, and tens of thousands of recreation and sports facilities were built in both rural and urban areas. These projects had the main goal of providing jobs for the unemployed, but they also played to a widespread demand at the time for bodily fitness and the need for recreation in a healthy society. Roosevelt was a strong supporter of the recreation and sports dimension of his programs.  The WPA spent $941 million on recreational facilities. including 5,900 athletic fields and playgrounds, 770 swimming pools, 1,700 parks, and 8,300 recreational buildings. WPA spent an additional $229 million on sports and recreational staff workers.Donald S Howard, The WPA and Federal Relief Policy, (1943) pp. 127, 130.

Olympics
Eight Olympic Games have taken place in the United States. The United States has won 2,522 medals at the Summer Olympic Games, more than any other country, and 281 in the Winter Olympic Games, the second most behind Norway.

21st century

The market for professional sports in the United States in 2012 is $69 billion (about 50% larger than that of all of Europe, the Middle East, and Africa combined.)

Baseball has been regarded as the national sport since the late 19th century, with Major League Baseball (MLB) being the top league, while American football is now by several measures the most popular spectator sport, with the National Football League (NFL) having the highest average attendance of any sports league in the world and a Super Bowl watched by millions globally. Basketball and ice hockey are the country's leading professional team sports to be primarily played indoors, with the top leagues being the National Basketball Association (NBA) and the National Hockey League (NHL). These four major sports, when played professionally, each occupy a season at different, but overlapping, times of the year. College football and basketball attract large audiences. In soccer, the country hosted the 1994 FIFA World Cup, the men's national soccer team qualified to seven World Cups and the women's team has won the FIFA Women's World Cup four times; Major League Soccer is the sport's highest league in the United States.

Boxing and horse racing were once the most watched individual sports, but they have been eclipsed by golf and auto racing, particularly NASCAR.

Nearly all sports in the United States were forced to completely halt operations during the COVID-19 pandemic in the United States beginning in March 2020. Individual sports such as golf, mixed martial arts and auto racing were the first to resume operations in May, with baseball, ice hockey and basketball following in July, without fans in attendance. The breadth and length of the cancellations was unprecedented in American history, as even during the 1918 Spanish flu pandemic, sports continued to be played with fans (only the 1919 Stanley Cup was canceled midway through due to the illness hitting one of the teams; baseball was played as normal as the peak of the flu season hit during the offseason, while football, still in its unorganized regional phase at the professional level, played reduced schedules).

See also

 Sports in the United States
 History of sport
 History of sport in Australia
 History of sports in Canada
 Sociology of sport

Specific sports
 Major professional sports leagues in the United States and Canada
 College athletics
 National Federation of State High School Associations
 Baseball in the United States
 Major League Baseball
 National Basketball Association
 College basketball
 Cricket in the United States
 American football
 College football
 National Hockey League
 Soccer in the United States
 Volleyball in the United States

Notes

Further reading

Surveys
 Daniel, Bruce. Puritans at Play: Leisure and Recreation in Colonial New England (1996) excerpt
 Eisen, George Eisen and David K. Wiggins, eds. Ethnicity and Sport in North American History and Culture (1995)  excerpt, scholarly essays on Indians, Germans, Irish, Jews, blacks, Hispanics, Japanese, Italians
 Gerdy, John R. Sports: The All-American Addiction (2002) online
 Gorn, Elliott J. A Brief History of American Sports (2004)
 Jackson III, Harvey H. ed. The New Encyclopedia of Southern Culture: Sports & Recreation (2011) online
 Jay, Kathryn. More Than Just a Game: Sports in American Life since 1945 (2004). online
 Daniel, Bruce. Puritans at Play: Leisure and Recreation in Colonial New England (1996) excerpt
 Struma, Nancy L. People of Prowess: Sport, Leisure, and Labor in Early Anglo-America (1996)  excerpt
 Wiggins,  David K. Out of the Shadows: A Biographical History of African American Athletes (2008); focus on 20 celebrities
 Zeigler, Earle F. ed. American sport and physical education History to 1975) (1975) online
 Zeigler, Earle F. ed. History and Status of American Physical Education And Educational Sport (2005) excerpt

Specific sports
 Goldstein, Warren. Playing for keeps: A history of early baseball (Cornell University Press, 2014).
 Hoffmann, Frank, Gerhard Falk, and Martin J. Manning. Football and American identity (Routledge, 2013).
 Riess, Steven. "The Cyclical History of Horse Racing: The USA's Oldest and (Sometimes) Most Popular Spectator Sport." International Journal of the History of Sport 31#1-2 (2014): 29–54.
 Ward, Geoffrey C., and Ken Burns. Baseball: An illustrated history (1996).

Race
 Martin, Charles H. "The Rise and Fall of Jim Crow in Southern College Sports: The Case of the Atlantic Coast Conference." North Carolina Historical Review 76#3 (1999): 253–284. in JSTOR

Historiography
 Pope, S.W. ed. The new American sport history: recent approaches and perspectives (U of Illinois Press, 1997
 Zeigler, Earle F. ed. History and Status of American Physical Education And Educational Sport (2005) excerpt

Primary sources
 Wiggins, David K. and Patrick B. Miller, eds. The Unlevel Playing Field: A Documentary History of the African American Experience in Sport'' (2005)  excerpt

Online resources
 Sports library of downloaded scholarly articles
 828 historic photographs of American sporting events and personalities; these are pre-1923 and out of copyright.